Lepidosperma benthamianum is a sedge of the family Cyperaceae that is native to Western Australia.

It is found in parts of the northern Wheatbelt region.

References

Plants described in 1908
Flora of Western Australia
benthamianum